Lar (also Romanized as Lār) is a village in Kharqan District, Zarandieh County, Markazi Province, Iran. At the 2006 census, its population was 149, in 51 families.

References 

Populated places in Zarandieh County